The following is a list of the 23 cantons of the Var department, in France, following the French canton reorganisation which came into effect in March 2015:

 Brignoles
 La Crau
 Draguignan
 Flayosc
 Fréjus
 La Garde
 Garéoult
 Hyères
 Le Luc
 Ollioules
 Roquebrune-sur-Argens
 Saint-Cyr-sur-Mer
 Sainte-Maxime
 Saint-Maximin-la-Sainte-Baume
 Saint-Raphaël
 La Seyne-sur-Mer-1
 La Seyne-sur-Mer-2
 Solliès-Pont
 Toulon-1
 Toulon-2
 Toulon-3
 Toulon-4
 Vidauban

References